Gerald William Arrigo (born June 12, 1941) is an American former professional baseball pitcher who appeared in 194 games in Major League Baseball (MLB) for the Minnesota Twins, Cincinnati Reds, New York Mets and Chicago White Sox between  and . He was a graduate of Harrison Technical High School in  his native city of Chicago.

His pro career began in 1960 in the White Sox organization. But after only one season in the Class D Midwest League, he was selected by the Twins in the first-year player draft then in effect. His first major league game occurred on June 12, 1961, when he started against the Boston Red Sox at Fenway Park. After hurling a scoreless first inning, he allowed three earned runs on three hits, a walk, and a hit batsman in the second inning. He was charged with the Twins' eventual 10–8 loss.

Arrigo threw two one-hit games in his career. On June 26, 1964, he had a no hitter going against the White Sox until Mike Hershberger hit a single to center in the top of the ninth inning. His second one-hitter, which came on April 29, 1967, lacked the suspense of the first, as Arrigo gave up the only hit of the game to the New York Mets' Jerry Grote in the first inning.

Appearing in 36 games (31 as starting pitcher) and 205 innings pitched, his record was 12–10 with a 3.33 earned run average with 140 strikeouts and five complete games.

Arrigo went on to play his final major league game with the White Sox, his original organization, on June 5, 1970. In 194 MLB games, with 80 starts, he compiled a 35–40 (4.14) record, with nine complete games, three shutouts and four saves. In 620 innings pitched, he allowed 605 hits and 291 bases on balls, striking out 433. He retired from pro ball in 1971.

References

External links

1941 births
Living people
American people of Italian descent
Baseball players from Chicago
Buffalo Bisons (minor league) players
Charlotte Hornets (baseball) players
Chicago White Sox players
Clinton C-Sox players
Cincinnati Reds players
Dallas Rangers players
Major League Baseball pitchers
Minnesota Twins players
New York Mets players
Richmond Braves players
San Diego Padres (minor league) players
Syracuse Chiefs players
Tucson Toros players
Vancouver Mounties players